Puente de Piedra (The Bridge of Stone), is a bridge in Lima, Peru in South America. It was built in 1608 by the architect Juan del Corral to link Lima with Rímac.

Construction
The bridge gets its name from the stone masonry mortar which was believed to have been mixed with egg whites from sea birds to improve its consistency.

References

Bridges in Peru
Bridges completed in 1608
Buildings and structures in Lima
1608 establishments in the Spanish Empire